Whaler Channel is the northernmost of three small channels leading into Husvik Harbor in Stromness Bay, South Georgia. The name appears to be first used on a 1930 British Admiralty chart.

Channels of the Southern Ocean